This is an incomplete list of Acts of the Parliament of Australia.

Principal Acts 

Note: This list does not include; Appropriation Acts, Customs Tariff Acts, Excise Tariffs, Excise Tariff Validation Acts, Income Tax Acts, Loan Acts or Supply Acts

Amending Acts

See also
List of Statutory Instruments of Australia
Parliament of Australia

References

External links
Complete list of current Acts

Acts of Parliament of Australia
Acts of Parliament of Australia
Australia